Geohistory may refer to:

 sub-disciplines of geography such as
 Historical geography – changes to geographical aspects of particular societies and environments;
 sub-disciplines of geology, such as
 Historical geology  – a discipline concerned mainly with
 the geological history of the Earth itself;
 genres of history, such as 
 Geographical history – the influence of geographical factors on human history,
 History of geodesy – development of the discipline concerned mainly with the Earth's overall shape, orientation in space, and gravitational field),
 History of geography – changes in human knowledge of geography,
 History of geology – development of the discipline concerned mainly with the origin, history, and structure of the Earth, and
 History of geophysics – development of the discipline concerned mainly with physical processes that shape the Earth.